The NCAA Division I softball tournament is held annually in May/June and features 64 college softball teams in the United States, culminating in the Women's College World Series (WCWS), which is played in Oklahoma City.

Tournament play and team selection
The tournament is unique in that it features four tiers of competition and a loss does not necessarily eliminate a team from contention. In fact, throughout the entire tournament a team can lose a total of four games and still be crowned champions.

A total of 64 teams compete in the tournament. 32 teams gain automatic entry into the tournament while the other 32 are selected by the Division I Softball committee. From this field of 64, 16 teams will be given "national seeds" and placed at one of the assigned regional sites, often the home field of each national seed.

The first round of the tournament, called "regionals", consists of 16 locations that include four teams competing in a double elimination bracket. The winner of each regional moves on to the second round, the "super regionals."

For the super regionals, the regional containing overall #1 seed will be matched up with the regional containing the overall #16 seed, the #2 seed regional will be matched up with the #15 seed regional, and so on. The higher seed of the two teams usually hosts the best-of-three series, with the winner moving on to the Women's College World Series.

The final eight teams meet at USA Softball Hall of Fame Stadium in Oklahoma City in the Women's College World Series.  The WCWS is further divided into two sections. The first part resembles the regional round, as teams are broken in two groups of four to play in a double-elimination bracket. The winners of each bracket then meet in a championship series similar to the super regional tier in that it is a best-of-three series. The winner of the WCWS is crowned national champion.

Team titles

See also
 AIAW Intercollegiate Women's Softball Champions
 NCAA Division II softball tournament
 NCAA Division III softball tournament
 NAIA Softball Championship

References

External links
NCAA Women's Softball Division I